Barry King (born 22 January 1985) is a former professional tennis player and Davis Cup player from Ireland. He was the Irish National Junior Champion before attending the University of Notre Dame on a tennis scholarship.

King played six Davis Cup rubber matches for Ireland in 2010 and 2011. He had a 2/2 record in singles and 1/1 record in doubles. In his last Davis Cup match, he won the deciding singles match to clinch a 3-2 win over Tunisia. In his last professional tournament, he reached the semi-finals of the Irish Open Futures event. He retired in July 2011 to pursue a career in finance.

References 

1985 births
Living people
Irish male tennis players
Notre Dame Fighting Irish men's tennis players